Florencio Aguilar Mejia  (born 31 July 1959) is a former Panamanian sprinter who competed in the men's 100m competition at the 1992 Summer Olympics. He recorded a 10.89, not enough to qualify for the next round past the heats. His personal best is 10.20, set in 1982. In the 1984 Summer Olympics, he competed in the 200m contest, running a 21.50.

References

1959 births
Living people
Panamanian male sprinters
Athletes (track and field) at the 1979 Pan American Games
Athletes (track and field) at the 1983 Pan American Games
Athletes (track and field) at the 1984 Summer Olympics
Athletes (track and field) at the 1991 Pan American Games
Athletes (track and field) at the 1992 Summer Olympics
Olympic athletes of Panama
World Athletics Championships athletes for Panama
Pan American Games competitors for Panama